Gilteritinib, sold under the brand  name Xospata, is an anti-cancer drug.
It acts as an inhibitor of FLT3, hence it is a tyrosine kinase inhibitor.

It was developed by Astellas Pharma.  

In April 2018, Astellas filed a new drug application with the Food and Drug Administration for gilteritinib for the treatment of adult patients with FLT3 mutation–positive relapsed or refractory acute myeloid leukemia (AML).

In November 2018, the FDA approved gilteritinib for treatment of adult patients with relapsed or refractory acute myeloid leukemia (AML) with a FLT3 mutation as detected by an FDA-approved test.

Gilteritinib was granted orphan drug status by the U.S. FDA, the European Commission (EC) and the Japan Ministry of Health, Labor and Welfare,  for some AML patients.

Gilteritinib was approved for medical use in Australia in March 2020.

References

Further reading

External links 
 
 
 

Pyrazines
Piperazines
Piperidines
Tyrosine kinase inhibitors
Orphan drugs
Astellas Pharma